Charles de Batz de Castelmore, also known as d'Artagnan and later Count d'Artagnan ( 1611 – 25 June 1673), was a French Musketeer who served Louis XIV as captain of the Musketeers of the Guard. He died at the siege of Maastricht in the Franco-Dutch War. A fictionalised account of his life by Gatien de Courtilz de Sandras formed the basis for the d'Artagnan Romances of Alexandre Dumas, père, most famously including The Three Musketeers (1844). The heavily fictionalised version of d'Artagnan featured in Dumas' works and their subsequent screen adaptations is now far more widely known than the real historical figure.

Early life 

D'Artagnan was born at the Château de Castelmore near Lupiac in south-western France. His father, Bertrand de Batz lord of Castelmore, was the son of a newly ennobled merchant, Arnaud de Batz, who purchased the Château de Castelmore. Charles de Batz went to Paris in the 1630s, using the name of his mother Françoise de Montesquiou d'Artagnan. D'Artagnan found a way to enter into the Musketeers in 1632 through the support of his uncle, Henri de Montesquiou d'Artagnan or perhaps thanks to the influence of Henri's friend, Monsieur de Tréville (Jean-Armand du Peyrer, Comte de Troisville). D’Artagnan joined the guards in the mid-1630s and served under Captain des Essarts. The regiment saw much action in the early 1640s, taking part in sieges at Arras, Aire-sur-la-Lys, la Bassée and Bapaume in 1640–41  and Collioure and Perpignan in 1642. Whether or not d’Artagnan was personally involved is unclear, but it is likely he took part in some, if not all, of these sieges. While in the Musketeers, d'Artagnan sought the protection of the influential Cardinal Mazarin, France's principal minister from 1643. In 1646, the Musketeers company was dissolved, but d'Artagnan continued to serve his protector Mazarin.

Career 

D'Artagnan had a career in espionage for Cardinal Mazarin, in the years after the first Fronde. Due to d'Artagnan's faithful service during this period, Louis XIV entrusted him with many secret and delicate situations that required complete discretion. He followed Mazarin during his exile in 1651 in the face of the hostility of the aristocracy.  In 1652, d'Artagnan was promoted to lieutenant in the Gardes Françaises, and fought at the Battle of Stenay in 1654, as well as in sieges at Landrecies and Saint-Ghislaine, then to captain in 1655. In 1658, he became a second lieutenant in the newly reformed Musketeers. This was a promotion, as the Musketeers were far more prestigious than the Gardes-Françaises.

D'Artagnan was famous for his connection with the arrest of Nicolas Fouquet. Fouquet was Louis XIV's finance commissioner and aspired to take the place of Mazarin as the king's advisor. Fouquet was also a lover of grand architecture and employed the greatest architects and artisans in the building of his Chateau Vaux-le-Vicomte. He celebrated the completion with a most extravagant feast, at which every guest was given a horse. The king, however, felt upstaged by the grandeur of the home and event and, suspecting that such magnificence could only be explained through Fouquet's pilfering the royal treasury, three weeks later had d'Artagnan arrest Fouquet. To prevent his escape by bribery, d'Artagnan was assigned to guard him for four years until Fouquet was sentenced to life imprisonment.

In 1667, d'Artagnan was promoted to captain-lieutenant of the Musketeers, the effective commander as the nominal captain was the king. As befitted his rank and position, he could be identified by his striking burgundy, white, and black livery—the colours of the commanding officer of the Musketeers. Another of d'Artagnan's assignments was the governorship of Lille, which was won in battle by France in 1667. D'Artagnan was an unpopular governor and longed to return to battle. He found his chance when Louis XIV went to war with the Dutch Republic in the Franco-Dutch War. After being recalled to service, d'Artagnan was subsequently killed in battle on 25 June 1673, when a musket ball tore into his throat at the siege of Maastricht.

The French historian Odile Bordaz believes that he was buried in Saint Peter and Paul Church in Wolder, a district of Maastricht, the Netherlands. Wolder was Louis XIV's headquarter during the Maastricht siege and he attended mass in the local church every day.  In contrast, the archaeologist Wim Dijkman, curator of the historical collections of the city of Maastricht at Centre Céramique, says that there is no historical or archaeological evidence of the claim.

Marriage and descendants 
On 5 March 1659 D'Artagnan married Anne-Charlotte Boyer de Chanlecy (1624-1683), lady of Sainte-Croix, and widow of Jean-Elenor de Damas. She was the daughter of Charles Boyer, lord of Chanlecy and Sainte-Croix, and Claude de Rymon, lady of la Rochette.  The couple soon separated, D'Artagnan pursuing his military career while his wife left Paris to live on her lands at Sainte-Croix, where she died on 31 December, 1683.

They had two sons, both of whom entered the military:

 Louis de Batz de Castelmore (the elder), was born in 1660, took the title of count d’Artagnan and died at Château de Castelmore in December 1709.

Louis de Batz de Castelmore (the younger), born 4 July 1661 in Chalon-sur-Saône, was a knight, later known as count d’Artagnan, baron of Sainte-Croix, lord of Chanlecy and Castelmore, and became maréchal de camp. He married on 21 May, 1707 Marie Anne Amé (1670–1714) and died on 7 June, 1714 at the castle of Sainte-Croix. He also had two sons:
Louis-Gabriel de Batz de Castelmore, born in 1710, was known as marquis of Castelmore and baron of Sainte-Croix, cavalry officer then gendarmerie officer. He sold on 30 October, 1769 the Château de Castelmore. He died in Paris on 15 August, 1783 at the age of 73. He married on 12 July, 1745 Constance Gabrielle du Moncel de Lourailles (1720-1764), widow of Joseph II Bonnier de la Mosson. He had a son Louis Constantin.
Louis Constantin de Batz de Castelmore, born in Paris on 25 July, 1747, Cavalry officer in the régiment Royal-étranger in 1764 in Strasbourg. He became second lieutenant on 5 April, 1764, capitaine captain in 1765, capitaine in 1772, assistant-major on 2 March, 1773. At the death of his father, he attended on August 16, 1783 the sealing of his apartment in Paris. He married on 24 April, 1793 Jeanne Molé (born in 1755). He lived in Paris then he  emigrated during the French Revolution Révolution. In 1809 he lived for two years at the prince of Bauffremont's castel at Scey-sur-Saône. On 16 March, 1826, he declared before a notary that he lives for twenty years at the prince de Bauffremont's castel in Scey sur Saône and that he does not own anything and lives at the expense of the prince. He died at the castel of Scey sur Saône on 14 December, 1827. He had two daughters : Louise-Constance (born in 1775) and Aglaé-Rosalie-Victorine (born in 1776).
 Louise-Constance de Batz de Castelmore, born on 4 May, 1775 in Paris. She had a son Jean-Guillaume-Ernest Batz, born in Besançon on 9 February, 1809, (his father is unknown). In  1833, she was still living  at the prince de Bauffremont's Castel in Scey-sur-Saône, when she gives consent to the marriage of his son Jean-Guillaume Bats. She died on 14 April, 1857 in Reims. 
Jean-Guillaume-Ernest Bats, born on 9 February, 1809 in Besançon, silk manufacturer in Lyon, he married on 9 February, 1834 in Lyon Julie Masson (1806-1839) with whom he will have a son François. He married on 15 April, 1840 in La Guillotière Claire Billon (1818-1875). They had 3 children : Constance-Claudine (born in 1841), Louis-Alexandre (born in 1847), married on 29 April, 1876 in Lyon Perret and Anne (born in 1850), married on 12 April, 1883 in Lyon François Cholat. 
 François Bats, born on 30 November, 1834 in  Lyon. Married on 8 November, 1862 in Lyon Catherine-Charlotte Damaisin. He had two daughters : Claire de Bats (1863) married on 22 February, 1883 Eugène Félix Marius Guilhaume and Jeanne-Anne de Bats.
Jeanne-Anne de Bats, born on 10 November, 1867 in Lyon, married on 17 September, 1895 in Lyon Alfred Cahn.In 1969 their grandson Maurice Cahn was allowed to change his name to « Bats » in memory of his ancestor the famous French musketeer Charles de Batz de Castelmore as known as d'Artagnan.
Maurice de Batz, has two sons, Olivier and Rolland, and three grandchildren: Antonin, Clément and Gaspart.
 Aglaé-Rosalie-Victorine de Batz de Castelmore, born on 4 September 1776 in Paris.

Portrayals in fiction 

The real d'Artagnan's life was used as the basis for Gatien de Courtilz de Sandras' novel Les mémoires de M. d'Artagnan. Alexandre Dumas in turn used Sandras' novel as the main source for his d'Artagnan Romances (The Three Musketeers, Twenty Years After and The Vicomte de Bragelonne), which cover d'Artagnan's career from his humble beginnings in Gascony to his death at Maastricht. Although Dumas knew that Sandras's version was heavily fictionalised, in the preface to The Three Musketeers he affected to believe that the memoirs were real, in order to make his novel more believable.

D'Artagnan is initially portrayed by Dumas as a hotheaded youth, who tries to engage the Comte de Rochefort and the three musketeers, Athos, Porthos, and Aramis in single combat. He quickly becomes friends with the musketeers, and has a series of adventures which put him at odds with Cardinal Richelieu, then First Minister of France. In the end, Richelieu is impressed by d'Artagnan, and makes him a lieutenant of the musketeers. This begins his long career of military service, as detailed in the sequels.

D'Artagnan's role among the musketeers is one of leadership (his skills and brains impress the musketeers greatly), but he is also regarded as a sort of protégé given his youth and inexperience. Athos sees him not only as a best friend and fellow musketeer but nearly as a son. At the end of the series, his death at the siege of Maastricht is given an extra tragic twist – he is mortally wounded while reading the notice of his promotion to the highest military rank.

Aleksandr Bushkov published a novel "D'Artagnan – a Guard of a Cardinal" ("Д′Артаньан – гвардеец кардинала"), I–II, Krasnoyarsk, Moskva, S-Peterburg 2002.

Some scholars believe aspects of D'Artagnan are drawn from the life and character of Dumas's mixed-race father, General Thomas-Alexandre Dumas. The incident when D'Artagnan challenges Porthos, Athos, and Aramis to duels on the same afternoon might be based on an incident in General Dumas's youth when he was insulted; and their subsequent friendship on General Dumas's youthful companionship with fellow soldiers in the Queen's Dragoons.

In other works 

 The Dutch novel In het krijt  by C. Hermans subtly refers to the possible location of the grave of d'Artagnan in Maastricht
 French poet Edmond Rostand wrote the play Cyrano de Bergerac in 1897. After one of the play's famous scenes, in which Cyrano defeats Valvert in a duel while completing a poem, d'Artagnan approaches Cyrano and congratulates him on his fine swordsmanship.
French writers Charles Quinel and Adhémar de Montgon published in 1930 another novel about d'Artagnan titled Le beau d’Artagnan et son époque.
 In Neal Stephenson's Quicksilver a story of d'Artagnan's death is related by one of the characters, Half-Cocked Jack.
 Musician Citizen Cope included a song titled "d'Artagnan's Theme" on his 2004 album The Clarence Greenwood Recordings.
 D'Artagnan is mentioned in Chapter 16 of Eric Flint's alternate history novel 1632, and in stories by Bradley Sinor in the 163x anthologies Ring of Fire III and Grantville Gazette V.
In the game Pokémon Black and White, a Pokémon is introduced named Keldeo. Keldeo belongs to a group of Swordsman Pokémon called The Swords of Justice, who are inspired by the Three Musketeers. Keldeo is inspired by d'Artagnan.
In the video game Metro: Last Light, one of the characters repeatedly refers to the protagonist as D'Artagnan, comparing the duo to "two of the three musketeers" and himself to Athos.
In the video game Monster Hunter Generations, one of the feline-type non-playable characters is named 'd'Artanyan', wearing a wide-brimmed hat and cape similar to many depictions of d'Artagnan.
Athletic teams at Xavier University in Cincinnati, Ohio are called the Musketeers, and their mascot is named D'Artagnan after the character.
In the Netflix Original show Stranger Things, the second season features a creature who is named d'Artagnan by Dustin Henderson, one of the protagonists
In Star Trek: The Original Series (season 1) The Naked Time, Sulu was using a fencing foil on the bridge and after he's rendered unconscious by Spock's nerve pinch, Spock says "Take d'Artagnan here to sickbay"

Film and television 
Actors who have played d'Artagnan on screen include:

Orrin Johnson in The Three Musketeers  (1916)
Aimé Simon-Girard in Les Trois Mousquetaires (1921)
Douglas Fairbanks in The Three Musketeers (1921), and The Iron Mask (1929)
Walter Abel in The Three Musketeers (1935)
Don Ameche in The Three Musketeers (1939)
Warren William in The Man in the Iron Mask (1939)
Gene Kelly in The Three Musketeers (1948)
Louis Hayward in Lady in the Iron Mask (1952)
Georges Marchal in Les Trois Mousquetaires  (1953, French)
Laurence Payne in The Three Musketeers (TV serial) (1954)
Maximilian Schell in The Three Musketeers (TV movie) (1960)
Gérard Barray in Les Trois Mousquetaires  (1961, French)
Jean Marais in Le Masque de fer (French film of The Man in the Iron Mask) (1962)
George Nader in The Secret Mark of D'Artagnan (1962, Italian)
Jean-Pierre Cassel in Cyrano and d'Artagnan  (1964, French)
Jim Backus in "The Three Musketeers," (an animated TV adaptation shown as a two-part episode of The Famous Adventures of Mr. Magoo) (1964)
Jeremy Brett in The Three Musketeers (TV serial) (1966)
John Greenwood in the Doctor Who episode, The Mind Robber (1968)
Bruce Watson in The Three Musketeers (an animated American TV series) (1968)
John Lynch in The First Churchills (BBC TV series), episode 1 "The Chaste Nymph" (1969)  
Kenneth Welsh in The Three Musketeers (Canadian TV movie) (1969)
Sancho Gracia Los Tres Mosqueteros (TV series) (1971)
Michael York in The Three Musketeers (1973), The Four Musketeers (1974), The Return of the Musketeers (1989), and La Femme Musketeer (TV miniseries) (2003)
Mikhail Boyarsky in d'Artagnan and Three Musketeers (1978) and its sequels (1992, 1993, 2009)
Louis Jourdan in The Man in the Iron Mask (TV movie) (1977)
Cornel Wilde in The Fifth Musketeer (1979)
Cam Clarke in Dogtanian and the Three Muskehounds (1981)
Nikolai Karachentsov in Dog in Boots (1981)
Chris O'Donnell in The Three Musketeers (1993)
Philippe Noiret in La fille de d'Artagnan (The Daughter of D'Artagnan aka Revenge of the Musketeers) (1994)
Dennis Hayden in an early 1998 film of The Man in the Iron Mask
Gabriel Byrne in The Man in the Iron Mask (1998)
Justin Chambers in The Musketeer (2001)
Hugh Dancy in Young Blades (unaired TV series pilot) (2001)
Charles Shaughnessy in Young Blades (TV series) (2005)
Logan Lerman in The Three Musketeers (2011)
Rinal Mukhametov in The Three Musketeers (2013 series)
Luke Pasqualino in The Musketeers (TV series) (2014–2016)
Note: Cornel Wilde, in addition to his role listed above, played the same-named son of d'Artagnan as the main hero in At Sword's Point (1952); Tobias Mehler was similarly cast in the Young Blades series, while the indicated performance there by Shaughnessy was a single guest appearance as his famous father. Andrew Rannells voiced d'Artagnan in the Japanese manga series Dinosaur King.

References

Bibliography 
 docteur Maurice Bats, Descent of d’Artagnan, Impr. F. Cocharaux, Auch, 1973, pages 55 à 60.

External links 
D'Artagnan's death at the 1673 siege of Maastricht, an article by Hennie Reuvers in Crossroads web magazine

1610s births
1673 deaths
Gascons
People from Gers
French military officers
17th-century French military personnel
D'Artagnan
D'Artagnan
D'Artagnan
D'Artagnan
D'Artagnan
Man in the Iron Mask
Musketeers of the Guard
French military personnel killed in action